The Tamarack River is an  tributary of the Middle Branch Ontonagon River in Iron and Gogebic counties on the Upper Peninsula of Michigan in the United States. The stream source is the outflow from Tamarack Lake. Via the Middle Branch of the Ontonagon River, its water flows north to the Ontonagon River and ultimately to Lake Superior.

See also
List of rivers of Michigan

References

Michigan Streamflow Data from the USGS

Rivers of Michigan
Rivers of Iron County, Michigan
Rivers of Gogebic County, Michigan
Tributaries of Lake Superior